The mottled swift (Tachymarptis aequatorialis) is a species of bird in the swift family, Apodidae. It is one of two species in the genus Tachymarptis together with the alpine swift (T. melba). It occurs widely in eastern Africa and locally in western Africa. It is found in Angola, Burkina Faso, Burundi, Cameroon, Central African Republic, Chad, Democratic Republic of the Congo, Ivory Coast, Eritrea, Ethiopia, Gabon, Ghana, Guinea, Kenya, Malawi, Mali, Mozambique, Nigeria, Rwanda, Sierra Leone, Sudan, Tanzania, Togo, Uganda, Zambia, and Zimbabwe.

Jali Makawa noted that the Alomwe people hunted these swifts by swirling long bamboo poles above them to swat the swifts down. Makawa and C.W. Benson tasted these birds and found them palatable.

References

External links
 Mottled swift - Species text in The Atlas of Southern African Birds.

mottled swift
Birds of Sub-Saharan Africa
Birds of East Africa
mottled swift
mottled swift
Taxonomy articles created by Polbot